The Staudinger reaction  is a chemical reaction of an organic azide with a phosphine or phosphite produces an iminophosphorane. The reaction was discovered by and named after Hermann Staudinger. The reaction follows this stoichiometry:
R3P + R'N3 → R3P=NR' + N2

Staudinger reduction
The Staudinger reduction is conducted in two steps. First phosphine imine-forming reaction is conducted involving treatment of the azide with the phosphine. The intermediate, e.g. triphenylphosphine phenylimide, is then subjected to hydrolysis to produce a phosphine oxide and an amine:
R3P=NR' + H2O → R3P=O + R'NH2

The overall conversion is a mild method of reducing an azide to an amine. Triphenylphosphine or tributylphosphine are most commonly used, yielding tributylphosphine oxide or triphenylphosphine oxide as a side product in addition to the desired amine. An example of a Staudinger reduction is the organic synthesis of the pinwheel compound 1,3,5-tris(aminomethyl)-2,4,6-triethylbenzene.

Reaction mechanism
The reaction mechanism centers around the formation of an iminophosphorane through nucleophilic addition of the aryl or alkyl phosphine at the terminal nitrogen atom of the organic azide and expulsion of diatomic nitrogen. The iminophosphorane is then hydrolyzed in the second step to the amine and a phosphine oxide byproduct.

Staudinger ligation
Of interest in chemical biology is the Staudinger ligation, which has been called one of the most important bioconjugation methods.  Two versions of the Staudinger ligation have been developed.  Both begin with the classic iminophosphorane reaction.  

In classical Staudinger ligation, the organophosphorus compound becomes incorporated into the peptide.   Typically, appended to the organophosphorus component are reporter groups such as fluorophores. In traceless Staudinger ligation, the organophosphorus group dissociates giving a phosphorus-free bioconjugate.

References

External links
Staudinger Reaction at organic-chemistry.org accessed 060906.
Julia-Staudinger Reaction

Organic redox reactions
Carbohydrate chemistry
Name reactions